Scott E. Hutchinson (born August 19, 1961) is an American politician from Pennsylvania currently serving as a Republican member of the Pennsylvania State Senate for the 21st district since 2013. He also served as a member of the Pennsylvania House of Representatives for the 64th District from 1992 to 2013.

Early life and education
Hutchinson graduated from Oil City Area High School and received a bachelor's degree in economics from The Wharton School of the University of Pennsylvania in 1983.  He has also studied at the University of Pittsburgh at Titusville and Thiel College.

Career
Hutchinson served as the chief deputy county treasurer for Venango County from 1984 to 1992.  In addition, he was a member of the Oil City Area School Board from 1986-1992.  He was also a member of the Venango County Board of Assistance until 1992.

He served as a member of the Pennsylvania House of Representatives for the 64th district from 1993 to 2012.

He was Republican chairman of the House Environmental Resources and Energy Committee and a member of the House Veterans Affairs and Emergency Preparedness Committee.

He was elected in an uncontested election to the Pennsylvania Senate to represent the 21st district. He succeeded Republican Mary Jo White, who retired at the end of her term in 2012.

Personal
He married Mary Beth Radkowski in 1993 and together they have three children (Sophie, Anne Marie, and Lucy) and live in Oil City.

References

External links
Senator Hutchinson official web site
Pennsylvania Senate profile

1961 births
21st-century American politicians
Living people
Republican Party members of the Pennsylvania House of Representatives
People from Oil City, Pennsylvania
Republican Party Pennsylvania state senators
School board members in Pennsylvania
Wharton School of the University of Pennsylvania alumni
Politicians from Oil City, Pennsylvania